Urban Latino magazine is an American lifestyle publication and website geared toward male and female Hispanic and Latino Americans ages 18–34. It was started in 1994 by a member of an art collective called Sol Concepts and a New York University student. Jorge Cano-Moreno and Rodrigo Salazar are the founders of the magazine, which is based in New York City.

References

External links
 Urban Latino official website

Lifestyle magazines published in the United States
Magazines established in 1994
Magazines published in New York City